The Flight of the Gossamer Condor is a 1978 American short documentary film directed by Ben Shedd, about the development of the Gossamer Condor, the first human-powered aircraft, by a team led by Paul MacCready. The Academy Film Archive preserved The Flight of the Gossamer Condor in 2007.

Reception
In the education magazine Media & Methods, David Mallery called Flight of the Gossamer Condor "a film or extraordinary appeal", writing that "the Shedds' most subtle achievement - least flashy, most serving to their subject - is that we are thoroughly caught up in the work of the MacCready group, are intimately a part of their struggles, their determination, their energy." Mallery concludes "It's a joyous experience. I recommend it with special enthusiasm."

The Flight of the Gossamer Condor won an Oscar at the 51st Academy Awards in 1979 for Documentary Short Subject.

Cast
 Bryan Allen as Himself - Final Pilot
 Paul B. MacCready as Himself (as Paul MacCready)
 Tyler MacCready as Himself
 Greg Miller as Himself
 Peter Lissaman (Engineer) as Himself
 Roger Steffens as Narrator (voice)

References

External links
Watch The Flight of the Gossamer Condor on YouTube, posted by San Diego Air and Space Museum

1978 films
1970s short documentary films
1978 independent films
American short documentary films
Best Documentary Short Subject Academy Award winners
Documentary films about aviation
American independent films
1970s English-language films
1970s American films